The 13th Pan American Games were held in Winnipeg, Manitoba, Canada from July 23 to August 8, 1999.

Medals

Silver

Women's Kumite (– 53 kg): Gladys Eusebio

Bronze

Men's Kata: Akio Tamashiro

See also
 Peru at the 2000 Summer Olympics

Nations at the 1999 Pan American Games
P
1999